Razdan may refer to:
Razdan (surname)
Hrazdan, Armenia
Razdan Dam, Armenia
Razdan Stadium, Armenia

See also
Hrazdan (disambiguation)